Barbara Adler  is a musician, poet, and storyteller based in Vancouver, British Columbia. She is a past Canadian Team Slam Champion,  was a founding member of the Vancouver Youth Slam, and a past CBC Poetry Face Off winner.

She was a founding member of the folk band The Fugitives with Brendan McLeod, C.R. Avery and Mark Berube  until she left the band in 2011 to pursue other artistic ventures.  She was a member of the accordion shout-rock band Fang, later Proud Animal, and works under the pseudonym Ten Thousand Wolves.

In 2004 she participated in the inaugural Canadian Festival of Spoken Word, winning the Spoken Wordlympics with her fellow team members Shane Koyczan, C.R. Avery, and Brendan McLeod.    In 2010 she started on The BC Memory Game, a traveling storytelling project based on the game of memory and had been involved with the B.C. Schizophrenia Society Reach Out Tour for several years. She is of Czech-Jewish descent.

Barbara Adler has her bachelor's degree and MFA from Simon Fraser University, with a focus on songwriting, storytelling, and community engagement.   In 2015 she was a co-star in the film Amerika, directed by Jan Foukal, which premiered at the Karlovy Vary International Film Festival.

Bibliography 

Squeezebox and Hound
B.C. Memory Game

Discography 

Flusterbush (2007)

With The Fugitives:
In Streetlight Communion (2007)
Face of Impurity (2007)
Find Me (2009)
Eccentrically We Love (2010)

With Fang:
Diskopatska (2010)

With Proud Animal:
Proud Animal (2012)

References

External links 
 
Ten Thousand Wolves

21st-century Canadian poets
Canadian women poets
Living people
Jewish Canadian writers
Jewish Canadian musicians
Musicians from Vancouver
Writers from Vancouver
Canadian people of Czech-Jewish descent
Canadian people of Czech descent
Simon Fraser University alumni
21st-century Canadian women writers
Year of birth missing (living people)